WHBQ-FM (107.5 MHz) is a Germantown, Tennessee, United States-based radio station broadcasting a classic hits format. It serves Memphis along with its northern and eastern suburbs from an antenna located in Cordova, Tennessee. It is commonly referred to as the "Q", and first hit airwaves on March 23, 2004. It is owned by the Flinn Broadcasting Corporation. Despite sharing call letters, WHBQ-FM is not co-owned with WHBQ-TV. It operates from its studios in Southeast Memphis.

History

Early years (1993-1997) 
The station first signed on in 1993, beginning as WAQK. A year later the call sign was changed to WJOI.

Top 40 (1997-2001) 
In 1997 the station took its first jab at the Top 40 radio market with another call sign change to WKSL, and the moniker "107.5 KISS FM". This station, like the "Q", had a format based on that of KIIS-FM in L.A.

Rhythmic (2001) 
this format was ended in 2001, and in August of that year it was changed to WYYL, a.k.a. "Wild 107-5". This station had a Rhythmic Contemporary Hit format, similar to that of another former Memphis station, Power 99.

Adult alternative (2002-2004) 
This format only lasted for four months before being turned into WMPS, a.k.a. "107 Oink Five, The Pig". The station aired an adult album alternative format. The format would move to 96.1 FM in 2004.

Top 40 (2004-2020) 
In 2004, after three years of Memphis not having a true Top 40 outlet, the station returned to Top 40 using the name "Q 107-5" and returning to the WHBQ-FM call letters. In 2010, the station expanded its signal by adding a simulcast on 96.1 FM, while 96.1 FM's format of AAA "The Pig" moved up the dial to WPGF-LP 87.7 FM.

On April 11, 2013, WIVG split from its simulcast with WHBQ-FM and began stunting with a loop of "Blister in the Sun" by Violet Femmes, and changed format to alternative rock at 4 p.m., branded as "96X".

Classic hits (2020-present) 
On September 28, 2020, at 9:54 a.m. after playing "If the World Was Ending" by JP Saxe feat. Julia Michaels, WHBQ began stunting with Christmas music. At 12:04 p.m., the station changed their format from top 40/CHR to classic hits branded as "107.5 WHBQ". The first song that played on WHBQ was "Always Something There To Remind Me" by Naked Eyes. The station airs the syndicated Rick Dees show in mornings.

WHBQ-HD2
On August 30, 2019, after stunting with a loop of "Wanna Be Startin' Somethin'" by Michael Jackson, WHBQ-FM launched a 1980's hits format on its HD2 subchannel, branded as "Z96.3" (simulcast on translator W242CF (96.3 FM), which was flipped from its alternative format as "I96").

On January 20, 2020, WHBQ-HD2/W242CF flipped back to alternative rock, reverting the "I96" branding. 367 days later, on January 22, 2021, at 3 p.m., WHBQ-HD2/W242CF flipped to top 40/CHR, branded as "B96.3", with the first song being "Holy" by Justin Bieber featuring Chance the Rapper.

On May 13, 2022 at noon, WHBQ-HD2 switched translators from W242CF to W249BN (97.7 FM), which replaced a classic hits format branded as "Guess-FM".

References

External links

HBQ-FM
Radio stations established in 1993
Germantown, Tennessee
Classic hits radio stations in the United States
1993 establishments in Tennessee